The Journal of World Prehistory is a peer-reviewed academic journal covering research on prehistory worldwide, with a focus on original treatments of the prehistory of a specific area or larger region. It is published by Springer Science+Business Media.

According to the Journal Citation Reports, the journal has a 2020 impact factor of 3.420.
, the editor-in-chief is Timothy Taylor.

References

External links

English-language journals
Online-only journals
Archaeology journals
Springer Science+Business Media academic journals